The Shrewsbury Borough School District is a community public school district that serves students ranging from pre-kindergarten through eighth grade from Shrewsbury, in Monmouth County, New Jersey, United States. The school features three homerooms per grade.

As of the 2018–19 school year, the district, comprising one school, had an enrollment of 479 students and 50.3 classroom teachers (on an FTE basis), for a student–teacher ratio of 9.5:1.

The district is classified by the New Jersey Department of Education as being in District Factor Group "I", the second-highest of eight groupings. District Factor Groups organize districts statewide to allow comparison by common socioeconomic characteristics of the local districts. From lowest socioeconomic status to highest, the categories are A, B, CD, DE, FG, GH, I and J.

For ninth through twelfth grades, most public school students are assigned to attend Red Bank Regional High School, which also serves students from the boroughs of Little Silver and Red Bank, along with students in the district's academy programs from other communities who are eligible to attend on a tuition basis. Students from other Monmouth County municipalities are eligible to attend the high school for its performing arts program, with admission on a competitive basis. The borough has two elected representatives on the nine-member Board of Education. As of the 2018–19 school year, the high school had an enrollment of 1,208 students and 119.6 classroom teachers (on an FTE basis), for a student–teacher ratio of 10.1:1.

School
The Shrewsbury Borough School had an enrollment of 479 students in grades PreK-8 during the 2018–19 school year.
Anthony Calandrillo, Assistant Principal

Administration
Core members of the school's administration are:
Brent A. MacConnell, Superintendent
Debi Avento, Business Administrator / Board Secretary

Board of education
The district's board of education, with nine members, sets policy and oversees the fiscal and educational operation of the district through its administration. As a Type II school district, the board's trustees are elected directly by voters to serve three-year terms of office on a staggered basis, with three seats up for election each year held (since 2012) as part of the November general election. The board appoints a superintendent to oversee the day-to-day operation of the district.

References

External links
Shrewsbury Borough School

School Data for the Shrewsbury Borough School District, National Center for Education Statistics
Red Bank Regional High School

School Data for the Red Bank Regional High School, National Center for Education Statistics

Shrewsbury, New Jersey
New Jersey District Factor Group I
School districts in Monmouth County, New Jersey
Public K–8 schools in New Jersey